Laranjal Paulista is a municipality in the state of São Paulo in Brazil. The population is 28,785 (2020 est.) in an area of 384 km². The elevation is 536 m.

References

Municipalities in São Paulo (state)